is a railway station in Mori, Kayabe District,  Hokkaidō, Japan.

Lines
Hokkaido Railway Company
Hakodate Main Line (Sawara branch line) Station N65

Adjacent stations

Railway stations in Hokkaido Prefecture
Railway stations in Japan opened in 1945